Poblacion (literally "town" or "settlement" in Spanish) is the common term used for the administrative center, central, downtown, old town or central business district area of a Philippine city or municipality, which may take up the area of a single barangay or multiple barangays. It is sometimes shortened to Pob.

History
During the Spanish rule, the colonial government founded hundreds of towns and villages across the archipelago modeled on towns and villages in Spain. The authorities often adopted a policy of Reducción, for the resettlement of inhabitants in far-flung scattered barangays to move into a centralized cabecera (town/district capital) where a newly built church and an ayuntamiento (town hall) were situated. This allowed the government to defend, control and Christianize the indigenous population, to conduct population counts, and to collect taxes.

Features
The población is considered the commercial and industrial center of the city or municipality. Most citizens of a city or municipality residing in the outlying barangays and satellite sitios flock to the población on market days (which is set by a local ordinance of the local government) because most local products and goods from the barrios are brought to the public market located in the población. In this way their products could be sold faster by a wide range of buyers, though there are instances where some citizens would choose to go to another town's población because it is closer to their residences. In some cities and towns, the población (usually the areas surrounding the parish church) doubles as an old town district that features one or more of a few remaining Spanish-built structures in the country. There are also some cases of cities that have multiple poblaciónes, like Iloilo City, where each geographical district has its own, as they were former independent municipalities during the Spanish era.

The cabecera (or the población of a municipio/pueblo) has a basic plan, with a plaza mayor, church and attached convento, civic buildings such as the town hall, and houses of prominent Spaniards.

Other features include the public market, the central elementary school and high school, police station, and hospital.

See also
 Barangay
 Purok
 Sitio

References

 
Barangays of the Philippines
Spanish words and phrases